Llanganten is a small village in the community of Cilmeri, Powys, Wales. The church in the village is dedicated to St. Cannen and it lies alongside the river Chwefri.

References

Populated places in Powys